Laojie River is a station on the Taoyuan Airport MRT located in Zhongli District, Taoyuan City, Taiwan. The station is scheduled to open for commercial service in July 2023.

Overview
This underground station will have one island platform with two tracks. Only Commuter trains will stop at this station. It is a planned transfer station with the Taoyuan Metro Yellow line (Y01).

Construction on the station began in March 2013, and is expected to open for commercial service in July 2023 with the opening of the Huanbei-Laojie River section of the Airport MRT.

Exits
Exit 1: Laojie River Riverside Park
Exit 2: Zhongfeng Road and Sec. 1 Jungyang West Road Intersection

See also
 Taoyuan Metro

References

Railway stations scheduled to open in 2023
Taoyuan Airport MRT stations